Müjdat is a Turkish given name for males. Notable people with the name include:

 Müjdat Gezen (born 1943), Turkish theatre actor and writer
 Müjdat Gürsu (1971–1994), Turkish footballer
 Müjdat Yetkiner (born 1961), Turkish footballer

Turkish masculine given names